Mya Azzopardi (born 29 September 2002) is a Maltese swimmer. She competed in the women's 100 metre freestyle at the 2019 World Aquatics Championships. In 2019, she won three bronze medals at the 2019 Games of the Small States of Europe held in Budva, Montenegro.

References

2002 births
Living people
Maltese female swimmers
Place of birth missing (living people)
21st-century Maltese women